Frederic Courtland Penfield (April 23, 1855   – June 19, 1922) was an American diplomat who served in London, Cairo, and as U.S. Ambassador to Austria-Hungary.

Biography
Frederic Penfield was born in Haddam, Connecticut, on April 23, 1855 to Daniel Penfield and Sophia Young  He received his early education at Russell's military school in New Haven, and later studied in England and Germany.
After several years with the Hartford Courant he became the United States vice consul in London in 1885. He married Katharine Albert McMurdo Welles (c1855-1905) in 1892.

He became the United States diplomatic agent to Egypt from 1893 to 1897. His wife died in 1905, and in 1907 he published the travelogue East of Suez: Ceylon, India, China and Japan describing his journeys through those countries. In 1908 he married Anne Weightman Walker, said to be one of the wealthiest women in the world.

He became the United States Ambassador to Austria-Hungary from 1913 to 1917. During the period of United States neutrality (1914-1917) in World War I, he took care of the interests in Austria-Hungary of several of the belligerents.

Penfield died on June 19, 1922, at his home on Fifth Avenue in Manhattan of "congestion of the brain". He was buried at Kensico Cemetery in Valhalla, New York.

Bibliography
  Online version at Project Gutenberg

References

External links
 
 
 
 Frederic Courtland Penfield at Flickr

1855 births
1922 deaths
Burials at Kensico Cemetery
People from Connecticut
Ambassadors of the United States to Egypt
Nobles of the Holy See